Acacia daviesioides is a shrub belonging to the genus Acacia. It is native to Western Australia. The species was first described by the botanist C.A.Gardner in the Journal of the Royal Society of Western Australia in 1942.

Description
The stems are mostly straight but can zig-zag with branches that are terete or angled. The phyllodes are continuous with the stems, sometimes decurrent and forming narrow
wings at base of stems.

A. daviesioides blooms between June and September producing yellow flower that are mostly 5-merous with sepals that are variably united. It will form seed pods later that are linear, raised on alternating sides over adjacent seeds, straight-edged or slightly constricted between the seeds. Mature seeds are formed by December.

The shrub is closely related to Acacia cerastes, both are found in the
Mount Gibson area north of Kalannie. A. cerastes can be differentiated by its twisted stems and rudimentary, non-pungent phyllodes.

Distribution
A. daviesioides grows in loamy, sandy-clay, sandy or gravelly soils. It is found in Low-lying area, sandplains, stony screes among heath, open scrub or shrubland.

It is found in scattered populations in the Wheatbelt and Mid West regions of Western Australia.  Its range extends from near Mingenew southeast to
the between Ballidu and Kalannie.

See also
 List of Acacia species

References

daviesioides
Acacias of Western Australia
Plants described in 1942
Taxa named by Charles Gardner